Cemetery Lips is an EP by American indie rock group Black Kids, released by Columbia Records on April 7, 2009 via digital download only.  It contains six tracks, three of which are remixes of tracks present on their previous release Partie Traumatic, and three new tracks.

Track listing
"Look at Me (When I Rock Wichoo) [Kid Gloves Remix]" – 6:24
"I'm Making Eyes at You (Joy Electric Remix)" – 4:34 
"Hurricane Jane (The Cansecos Remix)" – 6:22
"My Christian Name" – 1:34
"Power in the Blood" – 3:08
"You Only Call Me When You're Crying" – 3:27

Personnel
 Owen Holmes – bass guitar
 Kevin Snow – drums
 Dawn Watley – keyboards and vocals
 Ali Youngblood – keyboards and vocals
 Reggie Youngblood – guitar and vocals

References

External links
https://web.archive.org/web/20091126055343/http://www.blackkidsmusic.com/releases-cemetery.html Official Website

2009 EPs
Black Kids albums